

Current

Currently operating restaurants in Boston include:

 Anna's Taqueria
 Boca Grande Taqueria
Caffé Vittoria
Charlie's Sandwich Shoppe
Cheers Beacon Hill
 Dig
 The Fours
Galleria Umberto (restaurant)
 Legal Sea Foods
 Mantra
 O Ya
The Paramount, Boston
 Regina Pizzeria
 Santarpio's Pizza
 Smith & Wollensky
 South Street Diner
 Union Oyster House
 Upper Crust Pizzeria

Defunct

Defunct restaurants in Boston include:

 Anthony's Pier 4
 Biba
Brasserie Jo
 Doyle's Cafe
 Durgin-Park
 L'Espalier
Hamersley's Bistro
 Jacob Wirth Restaurant
Julien's Restorator
 Locke-Ober
 Young's Hotel

Restaurants
Boston